Rastapur is a panchayat village in the southern state of Karnataka, India. Administratively, Rastapur is under Shahapur Taluka of Yadgir district in Karnataka.  Rastapur is 6 km by road east of the village of Sagar and 6.5 km by road northwest of the village of Hattigudur. The nearest railhead is in Yadgir.

Demographics 
 census, Rastapur had 4,173 inhabitants, with 2,065 males and 2,108 females.

Notes

External links 
 

Villages in Yadgir district